Syritta vittata is a species of syrphid fly in the family Syrphidae.

Distribution
Iran, Turkmenistan, Pakistan.

References

Eristalinae
Diptera of Asia
Insects described in 1875
Taxa named by Josef Aloizievitsch Portschinsky